Durham Museum and Heritage Centre is a museum in Durham, England. It details the history of the City of Durham from medieval times to the present day. The museum is located in the redundant church of St Mary-le-Bow, close to the World Heritage Site of Durham Cathedral and Durham Castle. It is bounded on the north and east by Hatfield College; on the south by Bow Lane, and the west by North Bailey.  

The museum contains a variety of objects, models, pictures and audio-visual displays. These exhibitions provide the visitor with an overview of life, labour and leisure in this ancient fortified city, centre of pilgrimage and capital of the Prince Bishops of Durham. The museum also features a centre for making brass rubbings.

History 
The church was rebuilt in the 1670s to replace a church on the same site which collapsed in 1632, incorporating earlier material. The roof is fifteenth-century and the panelling is eighteenth-century. The tower dates from 1702.

The church closed in 1967, and the museum opened in 1972.

References

External links
Durham Museum and Heritage Centre

Museums in Durham, England
History museums in County Durham
Local museums in Durham, England
History of Durham, England
Former churches in County Durham
Churches in Durham, England